The Korea–Thailand Pro Volleyball All-Star Super Match is a volleyball exhibition game hosted every year by the Korea Volleyball Association (KVA), Korea Volleyball Federation (KOVO) and Thailand Volleyball Association (TVA), matching a mix of the Korean and Thai star players.

The All-Star Super Match was first played at the Indoor Stadium Huamark, Bangkok on 3 June 2017.

Venues

Match reports

Thailand 2017

Korea 2018

Thailand 2019

Match 1 – Nakhon Ratchasima

Match 2 – Bangkok

Notable players

Korea–Thailand rivalry

References

External links
 Korea Volleyball Association – Official website
 Korea Volleyball Federation – Official website
 Thailand Volleyball Association – Official website

 
Women's volleyball in South Korea
Women's volleyball in Thailand
Recurring sporting events established in 2017
2017 establishments in Thailand